The Planning-gain Supplement (Preparations) Act 2007 (c 2) is an Act of the Parliament of the United Kingdom.

The Treasury may by order repeal this Act.

Section 1 - Preparatory expenditure
This section provides:

"Secretary of State"

This means one of Her Majesty's Principal Secretaries of State.

References
Halsbury's Statutes,

External links
The Planning-gain Supplement (Preparations) Act 2007, as amended from the National Archives.
The Planning-gain Supplement (Preparations) Act 2007, as originally enacted from the National Archives.
Explanatory notes to the Planning-gain Supplement (Preparations) Act 2007.

United Kingdom Acts of Parliament 2007